The Colorado Buffaloes football program represents the University of Colorado Boulder in the Pac-12 Conference South Division of the National Collegiate Athletic Association. The team has had 25 head coaches since it started playing organized football in 1890. The university adopted the nickname Buffaloes in 1934 after previously being known as the Silver and Gold, Silver Helmets, Yellow Jackets, Hornets, Arapahoes, Big Horns, Grizzlies and Frontiersmen. Colorado played without a head coach during their first four years. The team first joined a conference in 1893 when they became a member of the Colorado Football Association. They joined the Colorado Faculty Athletic Conference in 1909, immediately followed by the Rocky Mountain Athletic Conference in 1910. Before the 1938 season, Colorado joined the Mountain States (Skyline) Conference. They joined the Big Seven Conference in 1948, which was renamed the Big Eight Conference in 1958 when Oklahoma State joined/rejoined the Conference. The Buffaloes became a charter member of the Big 12 in 1996 when the Big Eight disbanded. The Buffaloes have played in 1,139 games during their 120 seasons. In those seasons, nine coaches have led Colorado to postseason bowl games: Bunny Oakes, Dallas Ward, Bud Davis, Eddie Crowder, Bill Mallory, Bill McCartney, Rick Neuheisel, Gary Barnett, and Dan Hawkins. Nine coaches have won conference championships with the Buffaloes: Fred Folsom, Myron Witham, William Saunders, Oakes, Jim Yeager, Sonny Grandelius, Mallory, McCartney, and Barnett.

McCartney is the all-time leader in games coached, with 153, and total wins, with 93. Folsom had the longest tenure as head coach, remaining in the position for 15 seasons. Harry Heller and Willis Keinholtz are tied for the highest overall winning percentage. Each served a single season and won eight of his nine games for a winning percentage of .889. Of coaches who served more than one season, Folsom leads with a .765 winning percentage. Jon Embree is, in terms of overall winning percentage, the worst coach the Buffaloes have had with a .160 winning percentage. Former Colorado head coach Bill McCartney was inducted into the College Football Hall of Fame in 2013 and is the only CU coach to have won several national coach of the year honors, with all of them coming in 1989. Barnett won conference coach of the year honors in 2001 and 2004. Mike MacIntyre was hired on December 10, 2012.

Key

Coaches

Notes

References
General

Specific

Colorado

Colorado sports-related lists